The Texas LoneStar Strikers are an American professional men's basketball team based in the Magnolia, Woodlands, and Conroe, Texas area.

They are currently Independent, but once were members of the International Basketball League and began play in the league in 2013. The team is owned by businessman and former collegiate athlete Glenn Shepherd. The team colors are red, blue, gold and white.

References

External links
 Official team website

International Basketball League teams